Proeulia apospasta is a species of moth of the family Tortricidae. It is found in Chile.

The length of the forewings is about 10 mm. The forewings are ochreous, slightly ferruginous ochreous in external portion, and strongly ochreous at the wing base. The hindwings are light fuscous with a slightly brassy hue.

References

Moths described in 1964
Proeulia
Endemic fauna of Chile